= Operation Terminus =

US criminal investigation (2012)

- Date: 2012–2013
- Location: Arizona, California, Indiana
- Outcome: Successful operation, 77 arrests, $7.5 million and hundreds of pounds of narcotics seized.

Operation Terminus was a 30-month investigation into a Sinaloa Cartel drug smuggling ring in Arizona, California and Indiana. Beginning sometime in 2012, Operation Terminus investigators seized $7.5 million in cash, 485 pounds of methamphetamine, 50 Kilograms of cocaine, 4.5 pounds of heroin and 37 guns, including assault rifles, sniper rifles, and various other small arms. 77 suspects were indicted, and an "extensive drug trafficking network" stretching from Sinaloa, to Phoenix, Arizona, Los Angeles, and Indianapolis, was uncovered. Police officials have also reported that as result of the legalization of marijuana in some U.S. states, Mexican cartels are turning to more dangerous illegals drugs to make up for lost profits. A police spokesman in Tempe, Arizona, Lieutenant Mike Pooley commented on the situation: "They are plowing marijuana fields and planting opiates. It's killing our youths. It's an epidemic."

== See also ==
- Mexican drug war
